

Births and deaths

Deaths
 A.L. Lloyd (1908–1982)
 Ewan MacColl (1915–1989)
 John Lennon (1940–1980)

Recordings
 1980: Oyster Band (Oyster Band)
 1980: Sails of Silver (Steeleye Span)
 1981: Smiddyburn (Dave Swarbrick)
 1982: Moat On The Ledge - Live At Broughton Castle (Fairport Convention)
 1982: Shoot Out The Lights (Richard Thompson)
 1983: Abyssinians (June Tabor)
 1984: Close to the Wind (Dave Swarbrick)
 1985: Gladys' Leap (Fairport Convention)
 1986: Wall of Sound (Blowzabella)
 1986: Back in Line (Steeleye Span)
 1986: Expletive Delighted (Fairport Convention)
 1986: House Full (Fairport Convention)
 1987: In Real Time (Fairport Convention)
 1987: Heyday (Fairport Convention)
 1987: Borderlands (Kathryn Tickell)
 1988: A Richer Dust (Blowzabella)
 1989: Red and Gold (Fairport Convention)
 1989: Tempted and Tried (Steeleye Span)
 1989: 25 Years On The Road (Harvey Andrews)

See also
Music of the United Kingdom (1980s)

English folk music by date
1980s in British music
1980s in England